Alfred Lebbeus Loomis (October 16, 1831 – January 23, 1895) was an American physician who served as president of the Association of American Physicians.

Life and career 

Alfred Loomis was born in Bennington, Vermont.  He graduated from Union College in 1851, studied medicine at the College of Physicians and Surgeons, New York, and graduated in 1853 with an M.D. and again Union College with an A.M.  At this time the science of auscultation and percussion was developing very rapidly, and this circumstance led him to adopt diseases of the lungs and heart as his specialty.  He was appointed visiting physician to Bellevue Hospital in 1859, and became lecturer on physical diagnosis at the College of Physicians and Surgeons in 1862.

Shortly after this Loomis's health broke down completely, and he spent six months in the Adirondacks.  The benefit derived from his residence there led to the establishment, years later, of Dr. Edward Livingston Trudeau's Adirondack Cottage Sanitarium at Saranac, and also, at Liberty, Sullivan Co., N. Y., of a Hospital for Consumptives.  In 1866 Loomis became professor of the theory and practice of medicine at the University of the City of New York, the medical department of which later became University and Bellevue Hospital Medical College.  Professor Loomis was appointed visiting physician to Mount Sinai Hospital in 1874.

He was president of the New York Academy of Medicine in 1889–90 and again in 1891–92; and in 1893 served as president of the Association of American Physicians.  He published Lessons in Physical Diagnosis (1868; 11th edition, revised and enlarged, 1899);  Lectures on Fevers (1877);  A Text-Book of Practical Medicine (1884).  He was, in addition, editor of An American System of Medicine (1894).

Loomis died at home in New York City on January 23, 1895.

Term
 Loomis' mixture – a diarrhea mixture containing oil of sassafras I, tincture of opium 12, tincture of rhubarb 8, tincture of gambir 40, compound tincture of lavender to make 100.  Dose, 30 minims (2cc).  The American Illustrated Medical Dictionary (1938)

References

External links

 
 
 

Physicians from New York City
19th-century American physicians
American science writers
1831 births
1895 deaths
People from Bennington, Vermont
Loomis family